Grenadine was an indie rock 'supergroup' from Arlington, Virginia comprising Jenny Toomey (of Tsunami), Mark Robinson (of Unrest), and Rob Christiansen (of Eggs). The band released two albums and three singles in the early 1990s. In contrast to the band members other work, the band's sound has been described as "lounge-pop".

History
The band formed in 1991 and featured Jenny Toomey (vocals, guitar), Mark Robinson (vocals, guitar), and Rob Christiansen (trombone, guitar, drums). Debut single Triology and the Kramer-produced album Goya were released in 1992 on Shimmy Disc in association with Toomey's and Robinson's labels, Simple Machines and TeenBeat respectively. Second and final album Nopalitos was released in 1994. The band has been described as "indie-lounge-pop" and a "crooning, loungey cocktail act", being compared with Rudy Vallee. The band continued until 1998.

Discography

Albums
Goya (1992), Simple Machines/TeenBeat/Shimmy Disc
Nopalitos (1994), Simple Machines/TeenBeat

Singles
Triology (1992), TeenBeat/Simple Machines - "Fillings"/"Gillan"
"Don't Forget The Halo" (1993), TeenBeat/Simple Machines
Christiansen EP (1994), TeenBeat/Simple Machines

References

Indie rock musical groups from Virginia
Musical groups established in 1991
Musical groups disestablished in 1998
TeenBeat Records artists